Robert George Young (born 5 January 1950) is a Welsh former professional footballer. A midfielder, he joined Newport County in 1967 from local club Cromwell. He went on to make 104 appearances for Newport scoring 6 goals. In 1972, he joined Barry Town.

References

Footballers from Newport, Wales
Welsh footballers
Wales under-23 international footballers
Newport County A.F.C. players
English Football League players
Living people
Barry Town United F.C. players
1950 births
Association football midfielders